Schwerin – Ludwigslust-Parchim I – Nordwestmecklenburg I (English: Schwerin – Ludwigslust-Parchim I – Northwestern Mecklenburg) is an electoral constituency (German: Wahlkreis) represented in the Bundestag. It elects one member via first-past-the-post voting. Under the current constituency numbering system, it is designated as constituency 12. It is located in western Mecklenburg-Vorpommern, comprising the city of Schwerin and western parts of the districts of Ludwigslust-Parchim and Nordwestmecklenburg.

Schwerin – Ludwigslust-Parchim I – Nordwestmecklenburg I was created for the 2002 federal election. Since 2021, it has been represented by Reem Alabali-Radovan of the Social Democratic Party (SPD).

Geography
Schwerin – Ludwigslust-Parchim I – Nordwestmecklenburg I is located in western Mecklenburg-Vorpommern. As of the 2021 federal election, it comprises the independent city of Schwerin, as well as western parts of Ludwigslust-Parchim district (specifically the municipalities of Boizenburg, Hagenow, Ludwigslust, and Lübtheen, and the Ämter of Boizenburg-Land, Dömitz-Malliß, Grabow, Hagenow-Land, Ludwigslust-Land, Neustadt-Glewe, Stralendorf, Wittenburg, and Zarrentin) and Nordwestmecklenburg (specifically the Ämter of Gadebusch, Lützow-Lübstorf, Rehna, and Schönberger Land).

History
Schwerin – Ludwigslust-Parchim I – Nordwestmecklenburg I was created in 2002, then known as Schwerin – Ludwigslust. It contained parts of the abolished constituencies of Schwerin – Hagenow and Güstrow – Sternberg – Lübz – Parchim – Ludwigslust. Until 2013, it was constituency 13 in the numbering system. Originally, it comprised the independent city of Schwerin and the now-abolished district of Ludwigslust. In the 2013 election, it was expanded to include the Ämter of Gadebusch, Lützow-Lübstorf, Rehna, and Schönberger Land from the Nordwestmecklenburg district; it also acquired its current name and constituency number.

Members
The constituency was held by the Social Democratic Party (SPD) from its creation in 2002 until 2009, during which time it was represented by Hans-Joachim Hacker. It was won by the Christian Democratic Union (CDU) in 2009, and represented by Dietrich Monstadt. He was re-elected in 2013 and 2017. Reem Alabali-Radovan won the constituency for the SPD in 2021.

Election results

2021 election

2017 election

2013 election

2009 election

References

Federal electoral districts in Mecklenburg-Western Pomerania
2002 establishments in Germany
Constituencies established in 2002